Kikvidzensky District is an administrative district (raion), one of the thirty-three in Volgograd Oblast, Russia. Municipally, it is incorporated as Kikvidzensky Municipal District. It is located in the northwest of the oblast. Its administrative center is the rural locality (a stanitsa) of Preobrazhenskaya. Population:  18,860 (2002 Census);  The population of Preobrazhenskaya accounts for 31.3% of the district's total population.

References

Notes

Sources

Districts of Volgograd Oblast